This is a list of Japanese football transfers in the winter transfer window 2010–2011 by club.

J.League Division 1

Albirex Niigata

In:

Out:

Avispa Fukuoka

In:

Out:

Cerezo Osaka

In:

Out:

Gamba Osaka

In:

Out:

Júbilo Iwata

In:

Out:

Kashima Antlers

In:

Out:

Kashiwa Reysol

In:

Out:

Kawasaki Frontale

In:

Out:

Montedio Yamagata

In:

Out:

Nagoya Grampus

In:

Out:

Omiya Ardija

In:

Out:

Sanfrecce Hiroshima

In:

Out:

Shimizu S-Pulse

In:

Out:

Urawa Reds

In:

Out:

Vegalta Sendai

In:

Out:

Ventforet Kofu

In:

Out:

Vissel Kobe

In:

Out:

Yokohama F. Marinos

In:

Out:

J.League Division 2

Consadole Sapporo

In:

Out:

Ehime FC

In:

Out:

Fagiano Okayama

In:

Out:

FC Gifu

In:

Out:

FC Tokyo

In:

Out:

Gainare Tottori

In:

Out:

Giravanz Kitakyushu

In:

Out:

JEF Chiba

In:

Out:

Kataller Toyama

In:

Out:

Kyoto Sanga FC

In:

Out:

Mito HollyHock

In:

Out:

Oita Trinita

In:

Out:

Roasso Kumamoto

In:

Out:

Sagan Tosu

In:

Out:

Shonan Bellmare

In:

Out:

Thespa Kusatsu

In:

Out:

Tochigi SC

In:

Out:

Tokushima Vortis

In:

Out:

Tokyo Verdy

In:

Out:

Yokohama FC

In:

Out:

Japan Football League

A.C. Nagano Parceiro

In:

Out:

Arte Takasaki

In:

Out:

Blaublitz Akita

In:

Out:

F.C. Machida Zelvia

In:

Out:

F.C. Ryukyu

In:

Out:

Honda FC

In:

Out:

Honda Lock

In:

Out:

Kamatamare Sanuki

In:

Out:

Matsumoto Yamaga FC

In:

Out:

MIO Biwako Kusatsu

In:

Out:

Sagawa Printing SC

In:

Out:

Sagawa Shiga FC

In:

Out:

Sony Sendai FC

In:

Out:

Tochigi Uva F.C.

In:

Out:

V-Varen Nagasaki

In:

Out:

Yokogawa Musashino FC

In:

Out:

Zweigen Kanazawa

In:

Out:

References

External links

Transfers
Transfers
Japan
2010-11